Sweetzerland Manifesto is the sixth solo album by Aerosmith guitarist Joe Perry, released on January 19, 2018 on Roman Records.

Track listing

References

Joe Perry (musician) albums
2018 albums